Charles Arthur Anderson (September 26, 1899 – April 26, 1977) was a U.S. Representative from Missouri.

Born in St. Louis, Missouri, Anderson attended the public schools.
He graduated from St. Charles Military Academy in 1916 and from the law school of St. Louis University, LL.B., 1924 where he received his Masters of Jurisprudence Degree. He received his law degree from Harvard University.
During the First World War, he served in the 128th Field Artillery Regiment, 35th Division, under Harry Truman, from April 1, 1917, to July 2, 1919, with nineteen months service overseas.
He was admitted to the bar in 1924 and commenced practice in St. Louis, Missouri.
C. Arthur Anderson married Dorothy Johnson in 1929. They had seven children: Charles Arthur Anderson, Donald Edward Anderson, David Owen Anderson, Mary Adelle Anderson, Robert Klenfelter Anderson, Roger Duncan Anderson, and Thomas Eugene Anderson.
He served as prosecuting attorney of St. Louis County in 1933–1937. He prosecuted the famous Kelley Kidnapping Case in 1934 and 1935. On October 9, 1934, he was driving home after the trial and "some gangsters" ran his car off the road. C. Arthur suffered a compound fracture in his right leg and later developed an infection. This forced him to use a cane for the rest of his life.

Anderson was elected as a Democrat to the Seventy-fifth and to the Seventy-sixth Congresses (January 3, 1937 – January 3, 1941).
He was an unsuccessful candidate for reelection in 1940 to the Seventy-seventh Congress.
He served as chairman of the Democratic State convention at St. Louis in 1940.
He resumed the practice of law in St. Louis, Missouri, where he died April 26, 1977.
He was interred in Sunset Burial Park.

References

1899 births
1977 deaths
United States Army personnel of World War I
Harvard Law School alumni
United States Army soldiers
Democratic Party members of the United States House of Representatives from Missouri
20th-century American politicians